Abyssochrysidae is a family of sea snails, marine gastropod mollusks in the clade Caenogastropoda (according to the taxonomy of the Gastropoda by Bouchet & Rocroi, 2005).

Taxonomy 
The family Abyssochrysidae was previously placed in the "Zygopleuroid group" (according to the taxonomy of the Gastropoda by Bouchet & Rocroi, 2005). This family has no subfamilies (according to the taxonomy of the Gastropoda by Bouchet & Rocroi, 2005).

In 2008, the sister group Provannidae was moved into the superfamily Abyssochrysoidea Tomlin, 1927 by Kain et al. and the family Abyssochrysidae was also moved into the superfamily Abyssochrysoidea.

Genera 
Genera within this family include:
 Acanthostrophia
 Acanthostrophia acanthica - a fossil from the Jurassic of Italy, and the oldest known species in the family Abyssochrysidae.
 Abyssochrysos Tomlin, 1927 - the type genus of the family
 Humptulipsia Kiel, 2008
 Humptulipsia raui (Goedert & Kaler, 1996) - synonym: Abyssochrysos raui Goedert & Kaler, 1996 - a fossil species from the Eocene

References

Further reading 
 Goedert J. L. & Kaler K. L. (1996). "A new species of Abyssochrysos (Gastropoda: Loxonematoidea) from a Middle Eocene Cold Seep Carbonate in the Humptulips Formation, Western Washington". Veliger 39: 65-70.
 Houbrick R. S. (1979). "Classification and systematic relationships of the Abyssochrysidae, a relict family of bathyal snails". Smithsonian Contributions to Zoology 290: 1-21.

External links 

 
Gastropod families